Jacques Villon (July 31, 1875 – June 9, 1963), also known as Gaston Duchamp, was a French Cubist and abstract painter and printmaker.

Early life
Born Émile Méry Frédéric Gaston Duchamp in Damville, Eure, in Normandy, France, he came from a prosperous and artistically inclined family. While he was a young man, his maternal grandfather Émile Frédéric Nicolle, a successful businessman and artist, educated Villon and his siblings.

Gaston Duchamp was the elder brother of:
Raymond Duchamp-Villon (1876–1918), sculptor
Marcel Duchamp (1887–1968), painter, sculptor and author
Suzanne Duchamp-Crotti (1889–1963), painter

In 1894, he and his brother Raymond moved to Montmartre in Paris. There, he studied law at the University of Paris, but received his father's permission to study art on the condition that he must continue studying law.

To distinguish himself from his siblings, Gaston Duchamp adopted the pseudonym of Jacques Villon as a tribute to the French medieval poet François Villon. In Montmartre, home to an expanding art community, Villon lost interest in the pursuit of a legal career, and for the next 10 years he worked in graphic media, contributing cartoons and illustrations to Parisian newspapers. His work appeared in the satirical weekly Le Courrier français. Villon created only seven advertising posters in his career, all of which are in the soft styles of the Belle Epoque.

In 1903 he helped organize the drawing section of the first Salon d'Automne in Paris. In 1904-1905 he studied art at the Académie Julian.

At first, he was influenced by Edgar Degas and Henri de Toulouse-Lautrec, but later he participated in the fauvist, Cubist, and abstract impressionist movements.

By 1906, Montmartre was a bustling community and Jacques Villon moved to Puteaux in the quiet outskirts of Paris. There, he began to devote more of his time to working in drypoint, an intaglio technique that creates dark, velvety lines that stand out against the white of the paper.  During this time he worked closely to develop his technique with other important printmakers such as Manuel Robbe.

His isolation from the vibrant art community in Montmartre, together with his modest nature, ensured that he and his artwork remained obscure for a number of years.

At his home, in 1911, he and his brothers Raymond and Marcel organized a regular discussion group with artists and critics such as Jean Metzinger, Albert Gleizes, Francis Picabia, Robert Delaunay, Fernand Léger and others that was soon dubbed the Puteaux Group (or the Section d'Or). Villon was instrumental in having the group exhibit under the name Section d'Or after the golden section of classical mathematics. Their first show, Salon de la Section d'Or, held at the Galerie La Boétie in October 1912, involved more than 200 works by 31 artists.

In 1913, Villon created seven large drypoints in which forms break into shaded pyramidal planes. That year, he exhibited at the Armory Show in New York City, helping introduce European modern art to the United States. His works proved popular and all his art sold. From there, his reputation expanded so that by the 1930s he was better known in the United States than in Europe.

Honors

An exhibition of Jacques Villon's work was held in Paris in 1944 at the Galerie Louis Carré, following which he received honors at a number of international exhibitions. In 1938 he was named Chevalier (Knight) of the Legion of Honor. In 1947 he was promoted to Officier (Officer) of the Legion of Honor. In 1950, Villon received the Carnegie Prize, the highest award for painting in the world, and in 1954 he was made a Commandeur (Commander) of the Legion of Honor. The following year he was commissioned to design stained-glass windows for the cathedral at Metz, France. In 1956 he was awarded the Grand Prix at the Venice Biennale exhibition.

Among Villon's greatest achievements as a printmaker was his creation of a purely graphic language for cubism – an accomplishment that no other printmaker, including his fellow cubists Pablo Picasso or Georges Braque, could claim.

Villon died in his studio at Puteaux.

In 1967, in Rouen, his last surviving artist brother Marcel helped organize an exhibition called Les Duchamp: Jacques Villon, Raymond Duchamp-Villon, Marcel Duchamp, Suzanne Duchamp. Some of this family exhibition was later shown at the Musée National d'Art Moderne in Paris.

Many important museums include works by Villon in their collections, including the Fine Arts Museums of San Francisco; Minneapolis Institute of Arts; Museum of Fine Arts, Boston; Art Institute of Chicago; Columbus Museum of Art (Columbus, Ohio); Museum of Modern Art, New York City; University of Michigan Museum of Art (Ann Arbor, Michigan); National Gallery of Art, Washington D.C.; Art Gallery of New South Wales (Sydney, Australia); Bibliothèque Nationale, Paris; and Musée Jenisch (Vevey, Switzerland).

Leading private collections which include the works of Villon are the Joachim Collection of Chicago, the Vess Collection of Detroit, and the Ginestet Collection of Paris.

Art market
In May 2004, an oil painting by Villon dated 1913 entitled L'Acrobate and measuring 39 ¼ by 28 ¼ inches sold at Sotheby's for $1,296,000 (US dollars).

References

Bibliography 
Tomkins, Calvin, Duchamp: A Biography. Henry Holt and Company, Inc., 1996.

External links
Francis Steegmuller Collection of Jacques Villon. General Collection, Beinecke Rare Book and Manuscript Library, Yale University.
Artcyclopedia Links to Villon's works
Jacques Villon.info
Works by Jacques Villons at the University of Michigan Museum of Art
https://postergroup.com/collections/all/products/guinguette-fleurie-13409

1875 births
1963 deaths
19th-century French painters
French male painters
20th-century French painters
20th-century French male artists
Abstract painters
Cubist artists
Académie Julian alumni
Orphism (art)
People from Eure
20th-century French printmakers
Sibling artists
Color engravers
French abstract artists
19th-century French male artists